Football at the 2009 Island Games may refer to:

 Football at the 2009 Island Games – Men's tournament
 Football at the 2009 Island Games – Women's tournament

 
2009 Island Games
2009 in association football
2009